The Cosmopolitan Club is one of the three 18-hole golf courses in Chennai, India. It was established in the late 19th century.

It has bowling since 2010.

See also
 Guindy Links
 Gymkhana Club

References

Sport in Chennai
Golf clubs and courses in Tamil Nadu
Sports venues in Chennai
19th-century establishments in India
Sports venues completed in the 19th century
Year of establishment missing